Vincent McMahon (18 January 1918 – 23 January 1988) was an Australian cricketer. He played in one first-class match for Queensland in 1946/47. McMahon was a right-hand fast-medium swing bowler who could move the ball both ways. He began his cricket career playing for St. Lawrence's Christian Brother's College playing well in warehouse cricket and he made his A grade debut for University in the 1940/41 season.

See also
 List of Queensland first-class cricketers

References

External links
 

1918 births
1988 deaths
Australian cricketers
Queensland cricketers
Cricketers from Queensland